Peter Jephson Cameron FRSE (born 23 January 1947) is an Australian mathematician who works in group theory, combinatorics, coding theory, and model theory. He is currently half-time Professor of Mathematics at the University of St Andrews, and Emeritus Professor at Queen Mary University of London.

Cameron received a B.Sc. from the University of Queensland and a D.Phil. in 1971 from the University of Oxford as a Rhodes Scholar, with Peter M. Neumann as his supervisor. Subsequently, he was a Junior Research Fellow and later a Tutorial Fellow at Merton College, Oxford, and also lecturer at Bedford College, London.

Work
Cameron specialises in algebra and combinatorics; he has written books about combinatorics, algebra, permutation groups, and logic, and has produced over 350 academic papers. In 1988, he posed the Cameron–Erdős conjecture with Paul Erdős.

Honours and awards 
He was awarded the London Mathematical Society's Whitehead Prize in 1979 and is joint winner of the 2003 Euler Medal. In 2008, he was selected as the Forder Lecturer of the LMS and New Zealand Mathematical Society. In 2018 he was elected a Fellow of the Royal Society of Edinburgh.

Books

Notes

References
Short biography

External links
Home page at Queen Mary University of London
Home page at University of St Andrews
Peter Cameron's 60th birthday conference
Theorems by Peter Cameron at Theorem of the Day
Peter Cameron's blog

Academics of Queen Mary University of London
Academics of the University of St Andrews
1947 births
Living people
Australian Rhodes Scholars
Algebraists
Coding theorists
Combinatorialists
Alumni of Balliol College, Oxford
University of Queensland alumni
Whitehead Prize winners
Model theorists
20th-century Australian mathematicians
21st-century Australian mathematicians
Group theorists